Until they were abolished in 2011 it had been the tradition for the British Labour Party to hold elections to the Shadow Cabinet whenever the Party was in Opposition. Cabinet members would be elected by the MPs within the Parliamentary Labour Party, usually at the beginning of a Parliamentary session. The PLP voted to abolish Shadow Cabinet elections at a meeting on 5 July 2011. The decision was later approved by Labour's National Executive Committee at the end of July, then at their annual conference in Liverpool in September.

See also
1951 Labour Party Shadow Cabinet election
1952 Labour Party Shadow Cabinet election
1953 Labour Party Shadow Cabinet election
1954 Labour Party Shadow Cabinet election
1955 Labour Party Shadow Cabinet election
1956 Labour Party Shadow Cabinet election
1957 Labour Party Shadow Cabinet election
1958 Labour Party Shadow Cabinet election
1959 Labour Party Shadow Cabinet election
1960 Labour Party Shadow Cabinet election
1961 Labour Party Shadow Cabinet election
1962 Labour Party Shadow Cabinet election
1963 Labour Party Shadow Cabinet election
1970 Labour Party Shadow Cabinet election
1971 Labour Party Shadow Cabinet election
1972 Labour Party Shadow Cabinet election
1973 Labour Party Shadow Cabinet election
1979 Labour Party Shadow Cabinet election
1980 Labour Party Shadow Cabinet election
1981 Labour Party Shadow Cabinet election
1982 Labour Party Shadow Cabinet election
1983 Labour Party Shadow Cabinet election
1984 Labour Party Shadow Cabinet election
1985 Labour Party Shadow Cabinet election
1986 Labour Party Shadow Cabinet election
1987 Labour Party Shadow Cabinet election
1988 Labour Party Shadow Cabinet election
1989 Labour Party Shadow Cabinet election
1990 Labour Party Shadow Cabinet election
1991 Labour Party Shadow Cabinet election
1992 Labour Party Shadow Cabinet election
1993 Labour Party Shadow Cabinet election
1994 Labour Party Shadow Cabinet election
1995 Labour Party Shadow Cabinet election
1996 Labour Party Shadow Cabinet election
2010 Labour Party Shadow Cabinet election

References

 
Parliamentary opposition